Indenolol is a beta-adrenergic blocker for the treatment of hypertension (high blood pressure). It was investigated in the 1980s, but is not known to be marketed . It is a derivative of a phenolic 4-indenol.

References

Beta blockers
Indenes
Isopropylamino compounds
N-isopropyl-phenoxypropanolamines